The 1997 VCU Rams men's soccer team represented Virginia Commonwealth University during the 1997 NCAA Division I men's soccer season. The Rams played in the Colonial Athletic Association for their third season. It was the program's 20th season fielding a men's varsity college soccer program.

The 1997 season was the first season that the VCU Rams earned a berth into the NCAA Division I Men's Soccer Tournament, by the virtue of winning the CAA Men's Soccer Tournament. VCU played Georgetown in the first round of the tournament, losing the match.

Schedule 

|-
!colspan=6 style="background:#000000; color:#F8B800;"| Regular season
|-

|-
!colspan=6 style="background:#;"| CAA Tournament
|-

|-

|-

|-
!colspan=6 style="background:#;"| NCAA Tournament
|-

|-

Statistics

References 
General
 
Footnotes

Vcu Rams
VCU Rams men's soccer seasons
Vcu Rams, Soccer
Vcu Rams